The Rhône-Alpes Regional Council was the Conseil régional of the former Rhône-Alpes region of France until its abolition on 1 January 2016 to form the new Auvergne-Rhône-Alpes region. It was  chaired by Jean-Jack Queyranne. It included 157 members.

The Regional Council of Rhône-Alpes was replaced by the new Regional Council of Auvergne-Rhône-Alpes of the newly formed Auvergne-Rhône-Alpes region on 1 January 2016 following the 2015 regional elections.

Seats

By party

Elections

2004

Past Regional Councils

1998

1992

1986

Past Presidents
 Charles Béraudier (1986-1988)
 Charles Millon (1988-1998)
 Anne-Marie Comparini (1999-2004)
 Jean-Jack Queyranne (2004-)

Politics of Rhône-Alpes
Rhône-Alpes